The Seattle Municipal Court is a city court of limited jurisdiction in King County, Washington. It was created in 1891 by the Washington State Legislature. The court handles misdemeanors, gross misdemeanors, civil offenses, and infractions.

Jurisdiction and administration 
The Seattle Municipal Court serves the City of Seattle.

According to Seattle City Ordinance 3.33.010, "[T]he purpose of the Court is to try violations of City ordinances and all other actions brought to enforce or recover license penalties or forfeitures declared or given by any such ordinances and perform such other duties as may be authorized by law."

The administration of security is handled by the Seattle Municipal Court Marshals, who are both law enforcement and security officers for the Seattle Municipal Court.

Current judges

Notes 

City Council
Courts in the United States